Rocky Run is a stream in northern New Castle County, Delaware. The stream flows for several miles through Brandywine Creek State Park and part of First State National Historical Park before feeding the larger Brandywine Creek. Rocky Run itself is fed by Hurricane Run, also located in Brandywine Creek State Park.

Course
Rocky Run rises in Devonshire, Delaware in Devon Park and then flows west-southwest to join Brandywine Creek about 0.25 miles northwest of Tavistock.

Watershed
Rocky Run drains  of area, receives about 47.8 in/year of precipitation, has a topographic wetness index of 477.25 and is about 31% forested.

See also
List of rivers of Delaware

References 

Rivers of New Castle County, Delaware
Tributaries of the Christina River